Donald Barrington Buchanan or Danny Buck (born in Saint Elizabeth Parish on September 28, 1942; died January 10, 2011) was a former Minister of Labour and Social Security for Jamaica. He also served in the Parliament of Jamaica where he represented St. Elizabeth South Western. He died of Colorectal cancer. His son is also a politician.

References 

Government ministers of Jamaica
People's National Party (Jamaica) politicians
People from Saint Elizabeth Parish
Deaths from colorectal cancer
1942 births
2011 deaths
Deaths from cancer in Jamaica